The Behinde is a mountain on Vancouver Island, British Columbia, Canada, located  southeast of Gold River and  west of Golden Hinde.

The Behinde is a member of the Vancouver Island Ranges which in turn form part of the Insular Mountains.

See also
 List of mountains in Canada

References

Vancouver Island Ranges
Two-thousanders of British Columbia
Nootka Land District